"Black Spiderman" is a song by American rapper Logic featuring singer  Damian Lemar Hudson. It was released on April 13, 2017, by Visionary Music Group and Def Jam Recordings, as the second single from his third studio album Everybody. It was awarded a 2017 MTV Video Music Award for "Best Fight Against the System." The song was produced by Logic, 6ix and DJ Khalil.

Background
Logic teased the song on November 30, 2016 on his Twitter account with the caption saying "When you feel it in your SOUL!". In the liner notes for the song, Logic said that:

This song is the celebration of unity and a world built upon division. People say things like I don’t see color, I just see people. To which I retour you should see color, you should see a black man, a white woman, a brown little girl or any other color of the rainbow.

Music video
The song's accompanying music video premiered on April 13, 2017 on Logic's Vevo account on YouTube. In August 2017, "Black Spiderman" was awarded an MTV Video Music Award for "Best Fight Against the System."

Commercial performance
"Black Spiderman" debuted at number 87 on the Billboard Hot 100 and number 80 the Canadian Hot 100 for the chart dated May 6, 2017.

Charts

Certifications

References

External links
Lyrics of this song at Genius

2017 singles
2017 songs
Logic (rapper) songs
Def Jam Recordings singles
MTV Video Music Award for Best Video with a Social Message
Songs written by DJ Khalil
Song recordings produced by DJ Khalil
Songs written by Sam Barsh
Songs written by 6ix (record producer)
Songs written by Logic (rapper)